Marcel Caens (1919 – November 2006) was a French classical trumpeter.

Early life
Born in Honfleur, Caens began studying the cornet at Villedieu-les-Poêles with Michel Havard.

Career
In 1937, he joined the army and met Bourvil and Louiguy (composer of La Vie en rose). He entered the Conservatoire de Paris with Eugène Foveau where he won the 2nd Prize for cornet in 1939.

From 1940 to 1943, he was a prisoner in Germany. In 1944, he won the 2nd Trumpet Prize and the First Prize in 1945.

In 1946, he was hired by the Moroccan Radio Orchestra in Rabat and at the  where he also taught at the Conservatory. In 1954, he became a professor at the Conservatoire National de Région de Dijon as well as principal trumpet of the Orchestre du Théâtre.
 
Marcel Caens is violinist Maurice Caens' nephew. He is the father of trumpeter Thierry Caens, saxophonist Jean-Pierre Caens, Hervé Caens, a music teacher, and Joëlle Caens (épouse Guidot).

Sources 
Article de Jean-Pierre Mathez pour le magazine international des cuivres BRASS BULLETIN No. 93 -I/1996, pages 68 to 78.

1919 births
2006 deaths
People from Honfleur
Conservatoire de Paris alumni
French classical trumpeters
Male trumpeters
20th-century French musicians
French music educators
20th-century trumpeters
20th-century French male musicians
20th-century classical musicians